The Victims of Communism Memorial is a memorial in Washington, D.C. It may also refer to:
 Victims of Communism Memorial, another name for two monuments in Chișinău, Moldova:
 Memorial to Victims of Stalinist Repression
 Monument to the Victims of the Soviet Occupation
 Victims of Communism Memorial Foundation, an organization in the United States that built the Washington D.C. memorial
 Memorial to the Victims of Communism in Prague, Czech Republic
 Memorial to the Victims of Communism – Canada, a Land of Refuge, a memorial under construction in Ottawa, Canada.
 Victims of Communism 1940–1991 Memorial in Tallinn, Estonia

See also 
 Soviet and communist studies#Victims of communism
 Comparison of Nazism and Stalinism
 Double genocide theory
 Mass killings under communist regimes